Brandon Teena (December 12, 1972 – December 31, 1993) was an American trans man who was raped and later, along with Phillip DeVine and Lisa Lambert, murdered in Humboldt, Nebraska by John Lotter and Tom Nissen. His life and death were the subject of the films The Brandon Teena Story and Boys Don't Cry.

Teena's murder, along with that of Matthew Shepard nearly five years later, led to increased lobbying for hate crime laws in the United States.

Life
Teena was born on December 12, 1972, in Lincoln, Nebraska, to JoAnn Brandon. His father died in a car accident in Lancaster County eight months before he was born, and he was raised by his mother.  Teena and his older sister Tammy lived with their maternal grandmother in Lincoln, before they were reclaimed by their mother when Teena was three years old and Tammy was six. The family resided in the Pine Acre Mobile Home Park in northeast Lincoln. JoAnn received disability checks and worked as a clerk in a women's retail store in Lincoln to support the family. As young children, Teena and Tammy were sexually abused by their uncle for several years, and Teena sought counseling for this in 1991. JoAnn remarried once from 1975 to 1980. Teena's family described him as being a tomboy since early childhood; Teena began identifying as male during adolescence and dated a female student during this period. His mother rejected his male identity and continued referring to him as her daughter. On several occasions, Teena claimed to be intersex.

Teena and his sister attended St. Mary's Elementary School and Pius X High School in Lincoln, where some remembered Teena as being socially awkward. During his second year, Teena rejected Christianity after he protested to a priest at Pius X regarding Christian views on abstinence and homosexuality. He also began rebelling at school by violating the school dress-code policy to dress in a more masculine fashion. During the first semester of his senior year, a U.S. Army recruiter visited the high school, encouraging students to enlist in the armed forces. Teena enlisted in the United States Army shortly after his eighteenth birthday and hoped to serve a tour of duty in Operation Desert Shield. However, he failed the written entrance exam by listing his sex as male.

In December 1990, Teena went to Holiday Skate Park with his friends, binding his breasts, to pass as male. In the months nearing his high school graduation, Teena became unusually outgoing and was remembered by classmates as a "class clown." Teena also began skipping school and receiving failing grades and was expelled from Pius X High School in June 1991, three days before high school graduation.

In the mid-1991, Teena began his first major relationship with Heather. Shortly after, Teena was first employed as a gas station attendant in an attempt to purchase a trailer home for himself and his girlfriend. However, his mother disapproved of the relationship and convinced her daughter Tammy to follow Teena to determine whether Teena's relationship with Heather was platonic or sexual.

In January 1992, Teena underwent a psychiatric evaluation, which concluded that Teena had a severe "sexual identity crisis". He was later taken to the Lancaster County Crisis Center to ensure that he was not suicidal. He was released from the center three days later and began attending therapy sessions, sometimes accompanied by his mother or sister. He was reluctant to discuss his sexuality during these sessions but revealed that he had been raped. The counseling sessions ended two weeks later.

In 1993, after some legal trouble, Teena moved to the Falls City region of Richardson County, Nebraska, where he presented as a man. He became friends with several residents. After moving into the home of Lisa Lambert, Teena began dating Lambert's friend, 18-year-old Lana Tisdel, and began associating with ex-convicts John L. Lotter (born May 31, 1971) and Marvin Thomas "Tom" Nissen (born October 22, 1971).

On December 19, 1993, Teena was arrested for forging checks; Tisdel used money from her father to pay Teena's bail. Because Teena was in the female section of the jail, Tisdel learned that he was transgender. When Tisdel later questioned Teena about his gender, he told her he was a hermaphrodite pursuing a sex change operation, and they continued dating. In a lawsuit regarding the film adaptation Boys Don't Cry, this was disputed by Tisdel. Teena's arrest was posted in the local paper under his birth name and thereupon his acquaintances learned that he was assigned female at birth.

Rape and murder
During a Christmas Eve party, Nissen and Lotter grabbed Teena and forced him to remove his pants, proving to Tisdel that Teena had a vulva. Tisdel looked only when forced to and said nothing. Lotter and Nissen later assaulted Teena and forced him into a car. They drove to an area by a meat-packing plant in Richardson County, where they assaulted and gang-raped him. They then returned to Nissen's home, where Teena was ordered to take a shower. Teena escaped from Nissen's bathroom by climbing out the window and going to Tisdel's house. He was convinced by Tisdel to file a police report, though Nissen and Lotter had warned Teena not to tell the police about the gang rape or they would "silence him permanently." Teena also went to the emergency room, where a standard rape kit was assembled but later lost. Sheriff Charles B. Laux questioned Teena about the rape. Reportedly, he seemed especially interested in Teena's transgender status, to the point that Teena found his questions rude and unnecessary and refused to answer. Nissen and Lotter learned of the report and began searching for Teena. They did not find him, and three days later, the police questioned them. Sheriff Laux declined to have them arrested because "What kind of a person was she? The first few times we arrested her, she was putting herself off as a guy."

Around 1:00 a.m. on December 31, 1993, Nissen and Lotter drove to Lambert's house and broke in. They found Lambert in bed and demanded to know where Teena was. Lambert refused to tell them. Nissen searched and found Teena under a blanket at the foot of the bed. The men asked Lambert if there was anyone else in the house, and she replied that Phillip DeVine, who at the time was dating Tisdel's sister, was staying with her. The duo then shot Teena in the stomach. Nissen testified in court that he had noticed that Teena was twitching, and asked Lotter for a knife, with which Nissen stabbed Teena in the chest, to ensure that he was dead. Nissen and Lotter then left, later being arrested and charged with murder. Nissen later testified that he shot Lambert in the stomach. After leaving the room to find DeVine, and then returning with him, Nissen shot Lambert a second time. The two men then took DeVine into the living room, sat him on the couch, and shot him twice. Nissen then returned to the bedroom where he shot Lambert a few more times. The two men then left, threw their weapons and gloves onto a frozen river, and returned to Falls City. They were arrested that afternoon, after which Nissen told deputies that he had witnessed John Lotter shoot three people to death in Humboldt. Police went to the river, where they retrieved the gloves and weapons, including the sheath holding the knife, which was printed with Lotter's name, tying them to the crime.

Teena is buried in Lincoln Memorial Cemetery in Lincoln, Nebraska, his headstone inscribed with his birth name and the epitaph daughter, sister, & friend.

Nissen accused Lotter of committing the murders. In exchange for a reduced sentence, Nissen admitted to being an accessory to the rape and murder. Nissen testified against Lotter and was sentenced to life in prison. Lotter denied the veracity of Nissen's testimony, and his testimony was discredited. The jury found Lotter guilty of murder and was sentenced to death. Lotter and Nissen both appealed their convictions. In September 2007, Nissen recanted his testimony against Lotter. He claimed that he was the only one to shoot Teena and that Lotter had not committed the murders. In 2009, Lotter's appeal, using Nissen's new testimony to assert a claim of innocence, was rejected by the Nebraska Supreme Court, which held that since—even under Nissen's revised testimony—both Lotter and Nissen were involved in the murder, the specific identity of the shooter was legally irrelevant. In August 2011, a three-judge panel of the Eighth U.S. Circuit Court of Appeals rejected John Lotter's appeal in a split decision. In October 2011, the Eighth Circuit rejected Lotter's request for a rehearing by the panel or the full Eighth Circuit en banc. Lotter next petitioned the Supreme Court of the United States for a review of his case. The Supreme Court declined to review Lotter's case, denying his petition for writ of certiorari on March 19, 2012, and a further petition for rehearing on April 23, 2012, leaving his conviction to stand. On January 22, 2018, Lotter was denied a third appeal by the U.S. Supreme Court.

Cultural and legal legacy
Because Teena had neither commenced hormone replacement therapy nor had gender confirmation surgery, he has sometimes mistakenly been identified as a lesbian by media reporters. However, some reported that Teena had stated that he planned to have sex reassignment surgery.

Following Lotter's sentencing in February 1996, Saturday Night Live aired a segment in which comedian Norm Macdonald joked: The comments were met with sharp criticism from trans and queer communities and organizations including The Transexual Menace, who threatened to picket SNL in the absence of an apology. Upon reviewing the show, NBC agreed the line was inappropriate and should not have aired, and said it would ensure that similar incidents would not happen in the future.

Joann Brandon sued Richardson County and Sheriff Laux for failing to prevent Teena's death and being an indirect cause. She won the case, which was heard in September 1999 in Falls City, and was awarded $80,000. District court judge Orville Coady reduced the amount by 85 percent based on the responsibility of Nissen and Lotter and by one percent for Brandon's alleged contributory negligence. This led to a remaining judgment of responsibility against Richardson County and Laux of $17,360.97. In 2001, the Nebraska Supreme Court reversed the reductions of the earlier award reinstating the full $80,000 award for "mental suffering", plus $6,223.20 for funeral costs. In October 2001, the same judge awarded the plaintiff an additional $12,000: $5,000 for wrongful death, and $7,000 for the intentional infliction of emotional distress. Laux was also criticized after the murder for his attitude toward Teena – at one point, Laux referred to Brandon as "it." After the case was over, Laux served as commissioner of Richardson County and later as part of his community's council before retiring as a school bus driver. He refused to speak about his actions in the case and swore at one reporter who contacted him for a story on the murder's twentieth anniversary.

In 1999, Teena became the subject of a biographical film entitled Boys Don't Cry, directed by Kimberly Peirce and starring Hilary Swank as Teena and Chloë Sevigny as Tisdel. For their performances, Swank won, and Sevigny was nominated for an Academy Award. Tisdel sued the film's producers for unauthorized use of her name and likeness before the film's release. She claimed the film depicted her as "lazy, white trash, and a skanky snake". Tisdel also claimed that the film falsely portrayed that she continued the relationship with Teena after discovering that he was transgender. She eventually settled her lawsuit against the movie's distributor for an undisclosed sum.

JoAnn Brandon publicly objected to the media referring to her child as "he" and "Brandon." Following Hilary Swank's Oscar acceptance speech, JoAnn Brandon took offense at Swank for thanking "Brandon Teena" and referring to him as a man. "That set me off," said JoAnn Brandon. "She should not stand up there and thank my child. I get tired of people taking credit for what they don't know." However, in 2013, JoAnn told a reporter that she accepted Teena being referred to as transgender in the media. Although she was unhappy with how Boys Don't Cry portrayed the situation, she said about the film, "It gave them [gay and transgender advocates] a platform to voice their opinions, and I'm glad. There were a lot of people who didn't understand what it was [Teena] was going through. We've come a long way." When asked how the murder affects her life today, JoAnn replied, "I wonder how my life would be different if she was still with me. She would be such a joy to have around. She was always such a happy kid. I imagine her being a happy adult. And if being happy meant Teena living as a man, I would be fine with that."

Brandon, an interactive web artwork created in 1998 by Shu Lea Cheang, was named for Brandon Teena. The artwork was commissioned by the Solomon R. Guggenheim Museum. Much of the site's content relates to Brandon's story.

The British duo Pet Shop Boys released a song titled "Girls Don't Cry" (a bonus track on UK issue of I'm with Stupid) about Teena in 2006. Vancouver-based pop-punk band JPNSGRLS released the song "Brandon", off their debut 2014 album Circulation, in memory of Brandon Teena.

In 2018, Donna Minkowitz, the journalist whose reporting on Teena's murder first brought the story to a wider audience, wrote a piece for the Village Voice in which she expressed her regret for not understanding transgender people when she wrote her original report.

See also

Notes

References 
The Brandon Teena Archive, Judith Halberstam

Reference notes

External links 

Brandon – An American Tragedy. By Herbert J. Friedman, Friedman Law Offices, Nebraska

1972 births
1993 deaths
20th-century American LGBT people
American transgender people
American murder victims
Burials in Nebraska
Deaths by firearm in Nebraska
Transgender men
Violence against trans men
People murdered in Nebraska
People from Lincoln, Nebraska
1993 in LGBT history
American victims of anti-LGBT hate crimes
LGBT people from Nebraska
Deaths by stabbing in the United States
1993 murders in the United States
Rapes in the United States
People from Falls City, Nebraska
Violence against men in North America
Corrective rape